Parliamentary elections were held in Iraq on 6 December 1934 to elect the members of the Chamber of Deputies.

Background
After the death of King Faisal I, his son Ghazi was crowned as King in September 1933. Ghazi dissolved Parliament on 27 August 1934.

Results
The elections resulted in the pro-government National Unity Party led by Prime Minister Ali Jawdat al-Aiyubi winning a majority of seats. The opposition and press claimed that the government heavily had intervened in the elections.

Aftermath
The new parliament lasted only for few months and was dissolved on 9 April 1935 and fresh elections were held later in the year.

References

Iraq
Elections in Iraq
1934 in Iraq